Mosabbek Hossain (born 15 October 1998) is a Bangladeshi cricketer. He made his List A debut for Kala Bagan Krira Chakra in the 2016–17 Dhaka Premier Division Cricket League on 2 May 2017. Prior to his List A debut, he represented Bangladesh in the 3rd-place playoff match against Sri Lanka in the 2016 Under-19 Cricket World Cup.

References

External links
 

1998 births
Living people
Bangladeshi cricketers
Kala Bagan Krira Chakra cricketers
Place of birth missing (living people)